Dirk Wouters (born 1955) was Belgium's ambassador to the United States.

Education 
Wouters earned a B.A. degree in law and economics at the University of Antwerp in 1975, a Master of Laws at the University of Leuven in 1978 and an M.S. at the London School of Economics in 1979.

Diplomatic career 
Wouters started his diplomatic career in the Belgian Federal Public Service Foreign Affairs in 1980, where he worked in the Consular and Disarmament Division and joined the Belgian delegation to the European Union in 1986. In 1995, he moved to the United States to work on political, military, and development issues as deputy permanent representative to the United Nations. He also helped establish the International Criminal Court.
From 2001 to 2003, Wouters served as coordinator of the Belgian Presidency and head of the Department for European Coordination and Integration. He was appointed Permanent representative to the EU Political and Security Committee in 2003 and in 2009 became diplomatic adviser to the prime minister. Wouters became chief of staff to the foreign minister and dealt mainly with Afghanistan and Libya policy.

In 2011, Wouters was appointed Belgium's Permanent representative to the EU and stayed in that position until he moved to Washington in 2016.
From 2016 to 2020, Wouters was Belgium's ambassador to the United States of America.

Personal life 
Wouters is married with one child.

References 

1955 births
Living people
University of Antwerp alumni
Alumni of the London School of Economics
Université catholique de Louvain alumni
Ambassadors of Belgium to the United States